The Tourists is the debut album from the British band The Tourists, released in 1979. The album peaked at #72 in the UK Albums Chart.

Two singles were released from the album. "Blind Among the Flowers" peaked at #52 in the UK Singles Chart, and "The Loneliest Man in the World" peaked at #32.

The album has never been issued on compact disc but some tracks can be found on the various compilation compact discs.

Track listing
Original credits:  All tracks written by Peet Coombes.
BMI database:  All tracks written by Coombes, except "The Loneliest Man In The World":  Coombes/Lennox/Stewart

"Blind Among The Flowers" - 3:30
"Save Me" - 1:54
"Fools Paradise" - 3:26
"Can't Stop Laughing" - 3:49
"Don't Get Left Behind" - 1:42
"Another English Day" - 1:15
"Deadly Kiss" - 3:55
"Ain't No Room" - 3:28
"The Loneliest Man in the World" - 4:06
"Useless Duration of Time" - 4:23
"He Who Laughs Last Laughs Longest" - 1:44
"Just Like You" - 4:48

Chart performance

Personnel
 Arranged By – The Tourists
 Artwork By (Design & Art) – Bill Smith
 Performer – Annie Lennox, David A. Stewart, Eddie Chin, Jim "Do It" Toomey, Peet Coombes
 Photography – Neil Kirk
 Producer – Conny Plank, The Tourists
 All tracks written by – Peet Coombes

References

1979 debut albums
The Tourists albums
Albums produced by Conny Plank
Logo Records albums